Geocharis is a genus of ground beetles in the family Carabidae. There are more than 40 described species in Geocharis.

Species
These 44 species belong to the genus Geocharis:

 Geocharis amicorum Zaballos, 1998
 Geocharis antheroi A.Serrano & Aguiar, 2011
 Geocharis auroque A.Serrano & Aguiar, 2019
 Geocharis barcorabelo A.Serrano & Aguiar, 2011
 Geocharis bifenestrata Zaballos, 2005
 Geocharis bivari A.Serrano & Aguiar, 2004
 Geocharis boieiroi A.Serrano & Aguiar, 2001
 Geocharis capelai A.Serrano & Aguiar, 2013
 Geocharis caseiroi A.Serrano & Aguiar, 2013
 Geocharis coiffaiti A.Serrano & Aguiar, 2006
 Geocharis cordubensis (Dieck, 1869)
 Geocharis elegantula Antoine, 1962
 Geocharis estremozensis A.Serrano & Aguiar, 2003
 Geocharis falcipenis Zaballos & Jeanne, 1987
 Geocharis femoralis Coiffait, 1969
 Geocharis fenestrata Zaballos, 2005
 Geocharis fermini A.Serrano & Aguiar, 2004
 Geocharis grandolensis A.Serrano & Aguiar, 2000
 Geocharis iborensis Zaballos, 1990
 Geocharis julianae Zaballos, 1989
 Geocharis juncoi Zaballos, 2005
 Geocharis korbi (Ganglbauer, 1900)
 Geocharis leoni Zaballos, 1998
 Geocharis liberorum Zaballos, 2005
 Geocharis margaridae A.Serrano & Aguiar, 2013
 Geocharis massinissa (Dieck, 1869)
 Geocharis monfortensis A.Serrano & Aguiar, 2000
 Geocharis montecristoi Zaballos, 2005
 Geocharis moscatelus A.Serrano & Aguiar, 2001
 Geocharis mussardi Antoine, 1962
 Geocharis notolampros Zaballos, 2005
 Geocharis noudari A.Serrano & Aguiar, 2013
 Geocharis olisipensis (Schatzmayr, 1936)
 Geocharis portalegrensis A.Serrano & Aguiar, 2001
 Geocharis quartaui A.Serrano & Aguiar, 2004
 Geocharis raclinae Antoine, 1962
 Geocharis rodriguesi A.Serrano & Aguiar, 2008
 Geocharis rotundata J.Serrano & Aguiar, 2006
 Geocharis ruiztapiadori Zaballos, 1996
 Geocharis sacarraoi A.Serrano & Aguiar, 2003
 Geocharis saldanhai A.Serrano & Aguiar, 2001
 Geocharis sebastianae J.Serrano & Aguiar, 2006
 Geocharis submersa A.Serrano & Aguiar, 2003
 Geocharis testatetrafoveata Zaballos, 2005

References

Trechinae